Lake Whillans is a subglacial lake in Antarctica. The lake is located under the Whillans Ice Stream at the southeastern edge of the Ross Ice Shelf in the west of the continent. Its temperature is −0.49 °C, below 0 °C because of the high pressure.

Lake Whillans, like the Whillans Ice Stream, is named for Ohio State University glaciologist Dr. Ian Whillans.

Discovery
The lake was first described in 2007 by Helen Fricker, a glaciologist at the Scripps Institution of Oceanography. Satellite laser altimeter data from NASA's ICESat had revealed the ice at that location rising and falling, leading her team to conclude the presence of the lake.

Research
On 28 January 2013, the Whillans Ice Stream Subglacial Access Research Drilling (WISSARD) team announced that they had reached the lake surface having drilled  through the ice above. Drilling was accomplished using a hot-water drill to create a borehole  in diameter.
Over the following days the team collected water samples and also sediment cores from the lake bottom. Initial analysis of water and sediment has revealed that they contain more than 3,900 kinds of microbial life. Bacteria are surviving in this environment without photosynthesis. The ecosystem is apparently based on the oxidation of ammonia and methane from sediments laid down at least 120,000 years ago.

According to WISSARD, the project “marks the first successful retrieval of clean whole samples from an Antarctic subglacial lake”. Similar efforts have been undertaken at Lake Vostok, where samples have yet to yield any discoveries, and at Lake Ellsworth, where drilling had to be abandoned.

These projects may yield insights into the search for life elsewhere in the Solar System. In particular, the moons Europa (Jupiter) and Enceladus (Saturn) have large amounts of liquid water beneath icy crusts.

In January 2015, drilling near the grounding line (transition point from fresh water to sea water) revealed a colony of fish, crustaceans, and jellyfish inhabiting the dark, frigid waters below the ice shelf. Images taken with a remote camera showed fish  and amphipods.

See also 

 Whillans Ice Stream
 Lake Vostok
 Lake Ellsworth

References

External links
 Whillans Ice Stream Subglacial Access Research Drilling (WISSARD)

Lakes of Antarctica
Subglacial lakes